The 1974 NCAA Men's Division I Outdoor Track and Field Championships were contested June 4−8 at the 52nd annual NCAA-sanctioned track meet to determine the individual and team national champions of men's collegiate University Division outdoor track and field events in the United States. This was the first championship after the NCAA rechristened the former University Division as Division I. 

The inaugural Division III championship, contested in Charleston, Illinois and won by Ashland, was also held this year after the NCAA's decision to split the former College Division into Division II and Division III. 

This year's meet was hosted by the University of Texas at Austin at Memorial Stadium in Austin.

Tennessee edged three-time defending champions UCLA in the team standings to take home their first team national title.

Team result 
 Note: Top 10 only
 (H) = Hosts

References

NCAA Men's Outdoor Track and Field Championship
NCAA Division I Outdoor Track and Field Championships
NCAA
NCAA Division I Outdoor Track and Field Championships